A knowledge arena is a virtual space where individuals can manipulate concepts and relationships to form a concept map. Individuals using a computer with appropriate software can represent concepts and the relationships between concepts in a node-relationship-node formalism. The process of thinking about the concepts and making associations between them has been called "off-loading" by Ray McAleese.

The concept map is a form of a semantic network or semantic graph. It is formally based on graph theory. In the concept map, concepts are represented by nodes. The relationship between nodes are represented by typed links (edges). In creating a map or graphic representation of what is known an individual intentionally interacts with the graphical interface or map and through a reflective process adds nodes (concepts) and/or adds relationships (edges or typed links) or modifies existing node-relationship-node instances. It is likely that the process of engaging with concepts and relationships between concepts brings about the creation of understandings as well as making the understandings explicit.

Many different claims have been made for the utility of the concept map. The interactive and reflective nature of map creation is highlighted by the use of the description knowledge arena. Although maps may represent what an individual knows at a point in time; it is likely that by interacting with the concepts and relationships in the knowledge arena individual continues to create and modify what that individual knows.

See also 
 Knowledge base
 Knowledge management
 Knowledge representation and reasoning

Notes and references 

Concepts